The Battle of Gandamak on 13 January 1842 was a defeat of British forces by Afghan tribesmen in the 1842 retreat from Kabul of General Elphinstone's army, during which the last survivors of the force—twenty officers and forty-five British soldiers of the 44th East Essex Regiment—were killed.

The biggest single surviving group of men, consisting of 20 officers and 45 European soldiers, mostly infantry from the 44th Regiment of Foot, tried to press on but found themselves surrounded on a snowy hillock near the village of Gandamak. With only 20 working muskets and two shots per weapon, the troops refused to surrender. A British sergeant is said to have cried "not bloody likely!" when the Afghans tried to persuade the soldiers they would spare their lives.

Sniping then began, followed by a series of rushes; soon the hillock was overrun by tribesmen. An officer named Captain Thomas Alexander Souter was mistaken by the Afghans as a high-ranking officer because they thought he was wearing a general's yellow waistcoat. In fact the officer had wrapped the regimental colours of the 44th Foot around his body. He was dragged into captivity along with a sergeant named Fair and seven privates. The remaining troops were killed. Traces of weapons and equipment from the battle could be seen in the 1970s and as late as 2010, the bones of the dead still covered the hillside.

References

1842 in military history
1842 in Afghanistan
January 1842 events
First Anglo-Afghan War